Yakiv Kripak (born 13 June 1978 in Zaporizhya, in the Ukrainian SSR of the Soviet Union - in present-day Ukraine) is a former Ukrainian football midfielder.

Career
Kripak is the product of FC Metalurh Zaporizhya's youth sportive school system. His first trainer was Ravil Sharipov.

After retired from playing career, he became an assistant coach in FC Avanhard Kramatorsk in the Ukrainian First League. On 3 December 2013 Kripak was appointed as the main coach of the same club.

He worked a coach of FC Avanhard Kramatorsk in the Ukrainian First League.

References

External links
 
 Profile at Allplayers.in.ua Site
 

1978 births
Living people
Footballers from Zaporizhzhia
Ukrainian footballers
Association football midfielders
Ukrainian football managers
FC Metalurh Zaporizhzhia players
FC Arsenal Kyiv players
FC CSKA Kyiv players
FC Shakhtar Donetsk players
FC Shakhtar-2 Donetsk players
FC Metalurh Donetsk players
FC Stal Alchevsk players
FC Stal-2 Alchevsk players
FC Oleksandriya players
FC Dnipro players
FC Dnipro-2 Dnipropetrovsk players
FC Vitebsk players
FC ZAlK Zaporizhzhia players
FC Spartak Sumy players
FC Desna Chernihiv players
FC Feniks-Illichovets Kalinine players
FC Slavkhlib Slovyansk players
FC Kramatorsk players
Ukrainian Premier League players
Ukrainian expatriate footballers
Expatriate footballers in Belarus
Ukrainian expatriate sportspeople in Belarus
FC Kramatorsk managers
Ukrainian Cup top scorers